Schefflera sipapoensis is a species of flowering plant in the family Araliaceae. It is endemic to Venezuela.

References 

sipapoensis
Flora of Venezuela